Three ships of the United States Navy have been named Cowell, after John G. Cowell.

 , was renamed Ward prior to launching.

Sources

United States Navy ship names